The Al-Ansar Party  is a political party in Egypt. It is one of three parties that are part of Hazem Salah Abu Ismail's network of political parties; the other two parties are the Egyptian Nation Party and the Flag Party. The party would have been part of a coalition including the People Party, the Building and Development Party and the Virtue Party; however Hazem Salah Abu Ismail formed a coalition called the Nation Alliance without the Al Ansar Party.

References

Conservative parties in Egypt
Islamic political parties in Egypt
Political parties in Egypt
Political parties with year of establishment missing
Salafi Islamist groups
Sunni Islamic political parties